Emilio "Mel" Bottiglieri (born 13 April 1979 in Port Hardy) is a Canadian soccer player. He played for seven years in the Scottish Football League as a left sided defender. He is of Italian ancestry.

Honours

Greenock Morton

 Scottish Football League Third Division: 1
 2002–03

External links

References

1979 births
Greenock Morton F.C. players
Hibernian F.C. players
Partick Thistle F.C. players
East Fife F.C. players
Albion Rovers F.C. players
Canadian soccer players
Living people
Scottish Football League players
Association football defenders
Expatriate footballers in Scotland
Canadian expatriate soccer players
People from the Regional District of Mount Waddington
Soccer people from British Columbia
Canadian sportspeople of Italian descent
Canadian expatriate sportspeople in Scotland